Litchfield Park is a city in Maricopa County, Arizona, United States. As of the 2020 census, the population of the city was 6,847, up from 5,476 in 2010.

History

The town of Litchfield Park is a historically affluent community outside of Phoenix named after its founder, Paul Weeks Litchfield (1875–1959). He was an executive of the Goodyear Tire & Rubber Company who came to the Phoenix area in 1916 in search of suitable land to farm a long-staple cotton that had previously been available only from the Sea Islands off the coast of Georgia and from Egypt. This cotton was needed to strengthen the rubber in the pneumatic tire, of which Goodyear was the world's largest producer. The East Coast cotton supply had been devastated by the boll weevil, and the African supply had been greatly reduced by World War I attacks from German U-boats. Litchfield went to the Phoenix area at the suggestion of the US Department of Agriculture, but was not successful in motivating local farmers to grow his cotton. Much of the land was bought for as little as $25 per acre. The cotton was cultivated with a workforce of mostly Mexican and Native American men. The U.S. Postal Service agreed to the name "Litchfield Park" in 1926. In 1929, the Wigwam Resort was opened to the public. In 1926, Litchfield went on to become the president of the Goodyear-Zeppelin Corporation, and then chairman of the board in 1930. He retired from the company in 1958, and spent the final months of his life as a resident of Litchfield Park at his home on Fairway Drive.

In 1964, Goodyear created Litchfield Park Land and Development Co. to expand Litchfield Park into a 90,000-resident community. Arden E. Goodyear was the head of the company, Patrick Cusick was vice president and general manager, and Victor Gruen was hired to design some of the buildings. Emanuel Cartsonis, who had worked with Cusick, became city planner. The plan called for 25,000 homes, a college, a junior college, eighteen elementary schools, ten junior high schools, and six high schools, as well as improvements to the town's golf course and Phoenix Trotting Park at an expense of at least $750 million. Goodyear made many mistakes during development, including selling properties right up to the curb line, which means that the city must get permission from property owners before they can put in a sidewalk. They abandoned their plans for expanding Litchfield Park before they were completed and sold whatever land they could.

Geography
Litchfield Park is bordered to the southeast by Avondale, to the west by Goodyear, and to the north by Glendale.

Climate
Litchfield Park has a hot desert climate (Köppen BWh).

Demographics

Litchfield Park had a population of 6,847 at the 2020 census.  The racial and ethnic composition of the population was 78.4% non-Hispanic white, 1.1% black or African American, 3.2% Native American, 3.0% Asian, 0.0% non-Hispanic from some other race, 0.8% two or more races and 13.8% Hispanic or Latino.
2020 census

Government
The mayor is Tom Schoaf, the vice mayor is Paul Faith. The city council members are: Ann Donahue, Ron Clair, John Romack, Tom Rosztoczy, and Lisa Brainard Watson.

The first mayor was Charles Salem.

Education
The Litchfield Elementary School District and the Agua Fria Union High School District serve Litchfield Park. Litchfield Elementary School District has some schools located in the city.

Transportation
Litchfield Park is not a member of Valley Metro, the regional transportation system. Valley Metro's Avondale ZOOM neighborhood circulator serves the border of Litchfield Park and Avondale along parts of Indian School Road.

Historic structures

Pictured are the following structures:
 Two of the original Litchfield Elementary School buildings – both date back to 1918 and are located at 13825 W Wigwam Blvd.

 The Litchfield Train Station – built in 1920, near Maricopa County 85 and Litchfield Road. It was a feeder station of the Southern-Pacific Rock-Island Line. In 2009, the City of Goodyear purchased the station for $5,000. The station was moved to city owned land by Maricopa County 85 and Estrella Parkway where it currently lies in a total state of abandonment and deterioration.
 St. Thomas Mission Church a.k.a. "St. Thomas Aquinas Mission Church" – built in 1919 and located in Wigwam Road. The church which was built primarily for the Mexican farm workers of the Southwest Cotton Company. Cardinal Francis Spellman once celebrated Mass in this mission church. In 1969, the Church became part of the Phoenix Diocese.
 The Church at Litchfield Park – built in 1938 and located at 300 East Wigwam Boulevard.
 The Wigwam Organizational House,  was originally built by The Goodyear Tire & Rubber Company in 1918, as lodging for local ranch suppliers. This was the first building of what was to become the Wigwam Hotel.
 The Wigwam Hotel – officially opened its doors to the public in 1929. The hotel came about as a result of an expansion of the 1918, Wigwam Organizational House. The hotel is located at 300 East Wigwam Boulevard. The Wigwam Hotel is a member of the Historic Hotels of America since 2010. Among the celebrities which have stayed in the hotel are Britney Spears, Clint Eastwood, Chuck Norris and Billy Joel.
 Aunt Mary's House – built in 1941 and located at 13912 West Camelback Road on the northwest corner of Camelback and Litchfield Roads. Mary Brintan-Tubbs was active in the Litchfield Park Community. During World War II she volunteered and worked at the Luke Air Force Base, rolling bandages, writing letters for soldiers, doing other necessary civilian tasks. Aunt Mary's House (as it is affectionately called), now is home to the Litchfield Park Historical Society and Museum.

Historic structures
The following are the images of the historic structures in Litchfield Park and its surrounding areas:

Tourism

 Kiwanis Litchfield Park Winter Trout Fishing Derby
 Annual Wigwam Festival of Fine Art
 Arts in the Park Concert Series
 Flavors of the West Festival
 Litchfield Park Friends of the Rec 10k, 5k, 1 Mile Run/Walk
 Annual Spring Art & Culinary Festival
 Memorial Day Ceremony
 "Splash Bash"
 Independence Day Fireworks Celebration

Notable people
 Ray King, former MLB relief pitcher
 Jacque Mercer, former Miss America
 Wayne Thornburg, Arizona state senator

See also

 Goodyear Farms Historic Cemetery a.k.a. "Litchfield Cemetery"

References

External links
 
 

Cities in Arizona
Cities in Maricopa County, Arizona
Populated places established in 1987
Populated places in the Sonoran Desert
Phoenix metropolitan area
Cemeteries in Arizona
1987 establishments in Arizona